The Animation Show of Shows is a traveling selection of the year's best animated short films. It is curated and presented by Acme Filmworks founder Ron Diamond. The show began in 1998 with the aim of showing the most original, funny, and intelligent short animated films from all over the world by presenting them to major animation studios, in hope of inspiring their influential animators and directors. Since 2007, a number of the films have been released as DVDs.

Films included in the Shows

Notes
≈ Oscar nominee
± Oscar winner

1st Annual Animation Show of Shows • 1999 
 Village of Idiots by Eugene Fedorenka and Rose Newlove  
 My Grandmother Ironed the King's Shirts≈ by Torill Kove
 3 Misses≈ by Paul Driessen
 When the Day Breaks≈ by Wendy Tilby and Amanda Forbis

2nd Annual Animation Show of Shows • 2000 
 Father and Daughter± by Michael Dudok de Wit
 La Pista by Gianluigi Toccafondo
 Run of the Mill by Borge Ring
 Crime and Punishment by Piotr Dumała

3rd Annual Animation Show of Shows • 2001 
 Radio Umanak by Marie José van der Linden
 A Hunting Lesson by Jacques Drouin
 Black Soul by Martine Chartrand
 Aria by Pjotr Sapegin

4th Annual Animation Show of Shows • 2002 
 Flux by Chris Hinton
 From the 104th Floor by Serguei Bassine
 Hasta Los Huesos by René Castillo
 Mt. Head≈ by Kōji Yamamura
 The Rise & Fall of the Legendary Anglobilly Feverson by Rosto
 Aunt Luisa by Tim Miller

5th Annual Animation Show of Shows • 2003 
 Fast Film by Virgil Widrich
 Cameras Take Five by Steven Woloshen
 Falling in Love Again by Munro Ferguson
 Car Craze by Evert de Beijer
 Nibbles≈ by Christopher Hinton
 The Toll Collector by Rachel Johnson
 Harvie Krumpet± by Adam Elliot
 Destino≈ by Dominique Monféry
 2D or Not 2D by Paul Driessen

6th Annual Animation Show of Shows • 2004 
 Get in the Car by Greg Holfeld
 Lorenzo≈ by Mike Gabriel
 Suite for Freedom by Aleksandra Korejwo, Caroline Leaf, Luc Perez
 The Man Without a Shadow by Georges Schwizgebel
 The Revolution of the Crabs by Arthur de Pins
 Ryan± by Chris Landreth

7th Annual Animation Show of Shows • 2005 
 At The Quinte Hotel by Bruce Alcock
 City Paradise by Gaëlle Denis
 Fallen by Peter Kaboth
 The Fan and the Flower by Bill Plympton
 Jona/Tomberry by Rosto
 Life in Transition by John Dilworth
 Morir de Amor by Gil Alkabetz
 One Man Band≈ by Andrew Jimenez, Mark Andrews
 Overtime by Oury Atlan, Thibaut Berland and Damien Ferrie

8th Annual Animation Show of Shows • 2006 
 Quien Engana No Gana by Rajiv Eipe, Kaustubh Ray
 The Danish Poet± by Torill Kove
 A Gentlemen’s Duel by Francisco Ruiz and Sean McNally
 My Love by Alexandr Petrov
 Shipwrecked by Frodo Kuipers
 No Time for Nuts≈ by Chris Renaud, Michael Thurmeier
 Tragic Story with Happy Ending by Regina Pessoa
 Lifted≈ by Gary Rydstrom

9th Annual Animation Show of Shows • 2007 
 John and Karen by Matthew Walker 
 Forgetfulness by Julian Grey 
 I Met The Walrus≈ by Josh Raskin 
 Madame Tutli-Putli≈ by Chris Lavis and Maciek Szczerbowski 
 Some Friends He Made: Molotov Alva Meets the Hobo King by Douglas Gayeton
 Ujbaz Izbeniki Has Lost His Soul by Neil Jack 
 La Memoria Dei Cani by Simone Massi 
 The Pearce Sisters by Luis Cook 
 How to Hook Up Your Home Theater by Kevin Deters, Stevie Wermers-Skelton
 En Tus Brazos by Fx Goby, Edouard Jouret and Matthieu Landour 
 The Irresistible Smile by Ami Lindholm 
 Beton by Ariel Belinco and Michael Faust 
 Administrators by Roman Klochkov 
 t.o.m. by Dan Gray and Tom Brown 
 Életvonal by Tomek Ducki 
 Camera Obscura by Matthieu Buchalski, Jean-Michel Drechsler and Thierry Onillon

10th Annual Animation Show of Shows • 2008 
 Keith Reynolds Can’t Make It Tonight by Felix Massie 
 La Maison en Petits Cubes± by Kunio Katō
 Kudan by Taku Kimura 
 A Mouse's Tale by Benjamin Renner
 I Slept with Cookie Monster by Kara Nasdor-Jones 
 Glago's Guest by Chris Williams 
 Hot Seat by Janet Perlman
 Presto≈ by Doug Sweetland
 Skhizein by Jeremy Clapin 
 KJFG No.5 by Alexey Alexeev

11th Annual Animation Show of Shows • 2009 
 Photograph of Jesus by Laurie Hill 
 The Da Vinci Time Code by Gil Alkabetz 
 Volgens de Vogels by Linde Faas 
 Santa: The Fascist Years by Bill Plympton
 Nuvole, Mani by Simone Massi 
 El Empleo by Santiago "Bou" Grasso 
 The Spine by Chris Landreth
 Chick by Michal Socha 
 Partly Cloudy by Peter Sohn
 Runaway by Cordell Barker

12th Annual Animation Show of Shows • 2010
 Coyote Falls, Matthew O'Callaghan
 Luis, Cristóbal León, Niles Atallah and Joaquín Cociña
 Tick Tock Tale, Dean Wellins 
 Love & Theft, Andreas Hykade
 The Silence Beneath The Bark, Joanna Lurie
 The Cow Who Wanted To Be a Hamburger, Bill Plympton
 Maska, Quay Brothers
 Jean Francois, Tom Haugomat & Bruno Mangyoku
 Galeria, Robert Prouch
 The Lost Thing±, Shaun Tan & Andrew Ruhemann

13th Annual Animation Show of Shows • 2011 
 La Luna≈ by Enrico Casarosa 
 Mobile by Verena Fels 
 Paths of Hate by Damian Nenow 
 Schlaf (Sleep) by Claudius Gentinetta and Frank Braun 
 Wild Life≈ by Amanda Forbis and Wendy Tilby 
 Luminaris by Juan Pablo Zaramella 
 Romance by Georges Schwitzgebel 
 The Fantastic Flying Books of Mr. Morris Lessmore± by William Joyce and Brandon Oldenburg 
 Journey to Cape Verde (Viagem a Cabo Verde) by José Miguel Ribeiro

14th Annual Animation Show of Shows • 2012 
 Paperman± by John Kahrs
 The Centrifuge Brain Project by Till Nowak 
 Here and the Great Elsewhere by Michele Lemieux 
 Una Furtiva Lagrima by Carlo Vogele 
 I Saw Mice Burying a Cat by Dmitry Geller 
 The Case by Martin Zivocky 
 7596 Frames by Martin Georgiev 
 Le Taxidermiste by Dorianne Fibleuil, Paulin Cointot, and Maud Sertour 
 Flamingo Pride by Tomer Eshed 
 Daffy's Rhapsody by Matt O'Callaghan 
 Oh Willy! by Emma de Swaef and Marc James Roels 
 Tentation by Loris Accaries, Marie Ayme, Claire Baudean, and Audrey Janvier 
 Tram by Michaela Pavlatova

15th Annual Animation Show of Shows • 2013 
 Get a Horse!± by Lauren MacMullan
 Gloria Victoria by Theodore Ushev
 Bless You by David Barlow-Krelina 
 Subconscious Password by Chris Landreth
 The Blue Umbrella by Saschka Unseld 
 Drunker Than a Skunk by Bill Plympton
 International Fathers Day by Edmunds Jansons 
 Home Sweet Home by Alejandrio Diaz, Pierre Clanet, Romain Mazevet and Stephane Paccolat 
 My Mom is an Airplane! by Yula Aronova 
 Madly in Love by Ikue Sugidono 
 Nana Bobo by Andrea Cristofaro, Valentina Del Miglio, Francesco Nicolo Mereu and Lucas Wild do Vale
 Requiem for Romance by Jonathan Ng 
 Marcel, King of Tevruen by Tom Schroeder 
 Ascension by Caroline Domergue, Florian Vecchione, Martin de Coudenhove and Thomas Bourdis

16th Annual Animation Show of Shows • 2014 
 Feast± by Patrick Osborne 
 Bang Bang! by Julien Bisaro 
 Marilyn Myller by Mikey Please 
 Lava by James Murphy 
 Me and My Moulton≈ by Torill Kove 
 365 by Greg and Myles McLeod 
 We Can't Live Without Cosmos≈ by Konstantin Bronzit
 Duet by Glen Keane 
 Hunger by Petra Zlonoga 
 The Bigger Picture≈ by Daisy Jacobs 
 Hipopotamy by Piotr Dumała

17th Annual Animation Show of Shows • 2015 
 The Story of Percival Pilts by Janette Goodey and John Lewis 
 Tant de Forets by Geoffrey Godet and Burcu Sankur 
 Snowfall by Connor Whelan 
 Ballad of Holland Island House by Lynn Tomlinson 
 Behind the Trees by Amanda Palmer and Avi Ofer 
 We Can't Live Without Cosmos by Konstantin Bronzit 
 Messages Dans L'Air by Isabel Favez 
 Stripy by Babak and Behnoud Nekooei 
 Ascension by Thomas Bourdis, Martin de Coudenhove, Caroline Domergue, Colin Laubry, and Florian Vecchione 
 In the Time of March Madness by Melissa Johnson and Robertino Zambrano 
 World of Tomorrow≈ by Don Hertzfeldt

18th Annual Animation Show of Shows • 2016 
 Stems by Ainslie Hendersen of Scotland
 Shift by Cecilia Puglesi and Yijun Liu of U.S.
 Pearl≈ by Patrick Osborne of the U.S.
 Crin-crin by Iris Alexandre of Belgium
 Mirror by Chris Ware, John Kuramoto, Ira Glass of U.S.
 Last summer in the garden by Bekky O’Neil of Canada
 Waiting for the New Year by Vladimir Leschiov of Latvia
 Piper± by Alan Barillaro of U.S.
 Bøygen by Kristian Pedersen of Norway
 Afternoon Class by Seoro Oh of Korea
 About a Mother by Dina Velikovskaya of Russia
 Exploozy by Joshua Gunn, Trevor Piecham, and John McGowan of U.S.
 Inner Workings by Leo Matsuda of U.S.
 Corpus by Marc Héricher of France
 Blue by Daniela Sherer of Israel
 Manoman by Simon Cartwright of England
 All Their Shades by Chloé Alliez of Belgium

19th Annual Animation Show of Shows • 2018 
 Can You Do It-Quentin Baillieux, France 
 Tiny Big-Lia Bertels, Belgium 
 Next Door- Pete Docter, U.S.
 The Alan Dimension-Jac Clinch, U.K.
 Beautiful Like Elsewhere-Elise Simard, Canada 
 Hangman- Paul Julian and Les Goldman, U.S.
 The Battle of San Romano- Georges Schwizgebel, Switzerland 
 Gokurosama-Clémentine Frère, Aurore Gal, Yukiko Meignien, Anna Mertz, Robin Migliorelli & Romain Salvini, France 
 Dear Basketball±-Glen Keane, U.S.
 Island-Max Mörtl and Robert Löbel, Germany 
 Unsatisfying-Parallel Studio, France 
 My Burden-Niki Lindroth von Bahr, Sweden 
 Les Abeilles Domestiques (Domestic Bees)-Alexanne Desrosiers, Canada 
 Our Wonderful Nature: The Common Chameleon- Tomer Eshed, Germany 
 Casino-Steven Woloshen, Canada 
 Everything-David O'Reilly, U.S.

20th Annual Animation Show of Shows • 2019 
 The Green Bird-Maximilien Bougeois, Quentin Dubois, Marine Goalard, Irina Nguyen, Pierre Perveyrie, France
 One Small Step≈-Andrew Chesworth &Bobby Pontillas, U.S.
 Grands Canons-Alain Biet, France
 Barry-Anchi Shen, U.S.
 Super Girl-Nancy Kangas & Josh Kun, U.S.
 Love Me, Fear Me-Veronica Solomon, Germany
 Business Meeting-Guy Charnaux, Brazil
 Flower Found!-Jorn Leeuwerink, The Netherlands
 Bullets-Nancy Kangas & Josh Kun, U.S.
 A Table Game-Nicholás Petelski, Spain
 Carlotta's Face-Valentin Riedl & Frederic Schuld, Germany
 Age of Sail-John Kahrs, U.S.
 Polaris-Hikari Toriumi, U.S.
 My Moon-Eusong Lee, U.S.
 Weekends≈-Trevor Jimenez, U.S.

Films included on DVD

Box Set 1 
 Gopher Broke by Jeff Fowler 
 The Hill Farm by Mark Baker  
 The Fan and the Flower by Bill Plympton 
 Astronauts by Matthew Walker 
 Das Rad by Chris Stenner, Heidi Wittlinger and Arvid Uibel 
 Ski Jumping Pairs by Riichiro Mashima
 City Paradise by Gaëlle Denis 
 Anijam by Marv Newland 
 Car Craze by Evert de Beijer 
 Jolly Roger by Mark Baker 
 Morir de Amor by Gil Alkabetz 
 Cameras Take Five by Steven Woloshen
 Hilary by Anthony Hodgson 
 Le Foto Dello Scandalo by Daniele Lunghini and Diego Zuelli 
 Fast Film by Virgil Widrich 
 A Gentlemen’s Duel by Francisco Ruiz and Sean McNally 
 Life in Transition by John Dilworth 
 The Revolution of the Crabs by Arthur de Pins

Box Set 2 
 Badgered by Sharon Colman 
 Swamp by Gil Alkabetz 
 Nibbles by Christopher Hinton
 Strange Invaders by Cordell Barker 
 Run of the Mill by Borge Ring 
 Falling in Love Again by Munro Ferguson 
 Hasta Los Huesos by René Castillo 
 Fallen by Peter Kaboth 
 Crime and Punishment by Piotr Dumała
 Get in the Car by Greg Holfeld 
 Aunt Luisa by Tim Miller
 The Toll Collector by Rachel Johnson 
 Ryan by Chris Landreth 
 Eat by Bill Plympton 
 Flux by Chris Hinton 
 My Grandmother Ironed the King’s Shirts by Torill Kove 
 Black Soul by Martine Chartrand 
 Shipwrecked by Frodo Kuipers

Box Set 3 
 Father and Daughter by Michael Dudok de Wit
 3 Misses by Paul Driessen
 From the 104th Floor by Serguei Bassine
 When the Day Breaks by Wendy Tilby and Amanda Forbis
 When Life Departs by Stefan Fjeldmark and Karsten Kiilerich
 Radio Umanak by Marie José van der Linden
 The Monk And The Fish by Michael Dudok de Wit
 A Hunting Lesson by Jacques Drouin
 2D or Not 2D by Paul Driessen
 Bob's Birthday by David Fine and Alison Snowden
 Aria by Pjotr Sapegin
 Girl's Night Out by Joanna Quinn
 The Cat Came Back by Cordell Barker
 Village of Idiots by Eugene Fedorenka and Rose Newlove
 In The Rough by Paul Taylor
 Mt. Head by Kōji Yamamura
 The Big Snit by Richard Condie
 The Man Without a Shadow by Georges Schwizgebel

Box Set 4 
 KJFG No.5 by Alexey Alexeev
 The Sweater by Sheldon Cohen
 When the Bats are Quiet by Fabio Lignini
 Skhizein by Jeremy Clapin
 Guard Dog by Bill Plympton
 Some Friends He Made: Molotov Alva Meets the Hobo King by Douglas Gayeton
 Oktapodi by Julien Bocabeille, Francois-Xavier Chanioux, Olivier Delabarre, Theirry Marchand, Quen-tin Marmier and Emud Mokhberi
 Beton by Ariel Belinco and Michael Faust
 La Memoria Dei Cani by Simone Massi
 A Mouse's Tale by Benjamin Renner
 Blackfly by Christopher Hinton
 En tus Brazos by Francois Xavier Goby, Edouard Jouret and Matthieu Landour
 Overtime by Oury Atlan, Thibaut Berland and Damien Ferrie
 The Da Vinci Time Code by Gil Alkabetz
 Santa: The Fascist Years by Bill Plympton
 Frank Film by Frank Mouris
 The Wallet by Vincent Bierrewaerts
 t.o.m. by Dan Gray and Tom Brown

Box Set 5 
 Madagascar, Carnet de Voyage by Bastien Dubois
 Ujbaz Izbeniki Has Lost His Soul by Neil Jack
 Granny O’Grimm’s Sleeping Beauty by Nicky Phelan
 Quest by Thomas Stellmach and Tyron Montgomery
 Administrators by Roman Klochkov
 At The Quinte Hotel by Bruce Alcock
 Harvie Krumpet by Adam Elliot
 Camera Obscura by Matthieu Buchalski, Jean-Michel Drechsler and Thierry Onillon 
 Keith Reynolds Can’t Make It Tonight by Felix Massie 
 La Pista by Gianluigi Toccafondo 
 George and Rosemary by David Fine and Alison Snowden
 A Little Routine by George Griffin
 The Lady and The Reaper by Javier Recio Gracia
 Your Face by Bill Plympton
 Bike Ride by Tom Schroeder
 Madame Tutli-Putli by Chris Lavis and Maciek Szczerbowski
 I Slept with Cookie Monster by Kara Nasdor-Jones
 Nuvole, Mani by Simone Massi

Box Set 6 
 The Danish Poet by Torill Kove
 Volgens de Vogels by Linde Faas
 Vive La Rose by Bruce Alcock
 El Empleo by Santiago "Bou" Grasso
 Strings by Wendy Tilby
 Eletvonal by Tomek Ducki
 Chick by Michal Socha
 Runaway by Cordell Barker
 John and Karen by Matthew Walker
 Sandburg’s Arithmetic by Lynn Smith
 At The Ends Of The Earth by Konstantin Bronzit
 I Met The Walrus by Josh Raskin
 The Irresistible Smile by Ami Lindholm
 Tragic Story With Happy Ending by Regina Passoa
 The Pearce Sisters by Luis Cook
 The Spine by Chris Landreth
 Fifty Percent Grey by Ruairí Robinson

Box Set 7 
 The Fantastic Flying Books of Mr. Morris Lessmore by William Joyce and Brandon Oldenburg 
 The Village by Mark Baker 
 Bitzbutz by Gil Alkabetz
 The Centrifuge Brain Project by Till Nowak 
 The God by Konstantin Bronzit 
 Crossroads (Die Kreuzung) by Raimund Krumme * Galeria by Robert Proch 
 Una Furtiva Lagrima by Carlo Vogele 
 No Room for Gerold by Daniel Nocke 
 This Way Up by Alan Smith & Adam Foulkes 
 Journey to Cape Verde by José Miguel Ribeiro
 La Taxidermiste by Antoine Robert 
 Crac! by Frédéric Back 
 Sunday (Dimanche) by Patrick Doyon 
 The Silence Beneath the Bark by Joanna Lurie 
 Sinna Mann (Angry Man) by Anita Killi 
 Fiumana (Flood) by Julia Gromskaya 
 Rope Dance by Raimund Krumme

Box Set 8 
 The Lost Thing by Shaun Tan and Andrew Ruhemann
 Lavatory Lovestory by Konstantin Bronzit
 Maestro by Geza M. Toth
 The Cow Who Wanted to Be a Hamburger by Bill Plympton
 Guard Dog Global Jam by Bill Plympton
 Romance by Georges Schwizgebel
 Paths of Hate by Damian Nenow
 Divers in the Rain by Olga Pärn and Priit Pärn
 The Renter by Jason Carpenter
 Luminaris by Juan Pablo Zaramella
 Rubicon by Gil Alkabetz
 Flamingo Pride by Tomer Eshed
 Here and the Great Elsewhere by Michãle Lemieux
 The Street by Caroline Leaf
 The Mysterious Geographic Explorations of Jasper Morello by Anthony Lucas
 Logorama by The French collective H5 (Francois Alaux, Hervã de Crãcy, Ludovic Houplain)
 Ring of Fire by Andreas Hykade
 Tentation by Loris Accaries, Marie Ayme, Claire Baudean and Audrey Janvier

Box Set 9 
 La Maison en Petits Cubes by Kunio Kato
 Hot Stuff by Zlatko Grgic
 Zoologic by Nicole Mitchell
 Let's Pollute by Geefwee Boedoe
 The Case by Martin Zivocky
 Esterhazy by Izabela Plucinska
 Wild Life by Wendy Tilby and Amanda Forbis
 Muybridge's Strings by Koji Yamamura
 Andrei Svislotskiy by Igor Kovalyov
 The Man Who Planted Trees by Frédéric Back
 Every Child by Eugene Fedorenko
 Mobile by Verena Fels
 French Roast by Fabrice O. Joubert
 Jean-François by Tom Haugomat and Bruno Mangyoku
 Passage by Raimund Krumme
 7596 Frames by Martin Georgiev
 Love and Theft by Andreas Hykade
 Schlaf (Sleep) by Claudius Gentinetta and Frank Braun

Giants' First Steps
Shades of Sherlock Holmes by Ron Clements
Next Door, Palm Springs & Winter by Pete Docter
Good Old Fashioned Cartoon Violence & For Sale by Eric Goldberg
Jack and the Beanstalk by Nick Park
Time for Love by Carlos Saldana
Fun with Father by Chris Sanders
 Early works of Henry Selick
The Strange Case of Mr. Donnybrook's Boredom and Mariner Man (with the voice of Bill Scott on the latter) by David Silverman
A Story and Somewhere in the Arctic by Andrew Stanton
 Early works of Kirk Wise, John Musker and Kevin Lima
A Birthday by Brenda Chapman
Frannie's Christmas by Mike Mitchell
 Early works of Chris Wedge

See also
National Film Board of Canada
Independent animation
Academy Award for Best Animated Short

References

External links 
 Animation Show of Shows Website

Animation compilation
2000s in animation
2010s in animation
Animation film festivals in the United States